The Youngstown Bears were a basketball team based in Youngstown, Ohio. They played two seasons (1945–1947) in the National Basketball League, before disbanding due to poor performances.

References

External links
Youngstown Bears at Basketball-Reference.com
Youngstown Bears Complete History at NBA Hoops Online

 
1945 establishments in Ohio
Basketball teams established in 1945
1947 disestablishments in Ohio
Basketball teams disestablished in 1947